Aleix Franch (born 29 September 1966) is a Spanish handball player. He competed in the men's tournament at the 1992 Summer Olympics.

References

External links
 

1966 births
Living people
Spanish male handball players
Olympic handball players of Spain
Handball players at the 1992 Summer Olympics
Sportspeople from Barcelona